Le Club des Chefs des Chefs (C.C.C.), founded by Gilles Bragard in 1977, is an international culinary organisation.

The main purposes of this official gathering are to promote the national kitchen, and act as diplomatic representatives. The chefs are in contact every day with their own heads of state or government and formed a unique international network. Annually, the president brings together the chefs of heads of state to meet and discuss their work.

The name of the organization is a play on words because in French, "chef" can mean either "kitchen chef" or "boss". In English, the name can be translated as "the Club of Chefs to Heads of State."

History 
In 2013, the Club participated in UN Secretary-General Ban Ki-moon's Zero Hunger Challenge.
The members annually gather on invitation of a member, and are received by the head of state. Chef Garcia, head chef of the Prince of Monaco was elected in 2012 to become president. In 2014, the members were received by The Queen and the Duke of Edinburgh.

Annual meetings 
2014 Annual meeting in London and Buckingham Palace
2015 Annual meeting in Switzerland and Italy
2016 Annual meeting in India

Current members
 President of the C.C.C.
 :  Christian Garcia: head chef to Albert II, Prince of Monaco.

Vice President of the C.C.C.
 :  Mark Flanagan, Chef of the King.

 Members
 : Chanthy Yen, Chef to the Prime Minister of Canada.
 : Rachid Agouray: Reception, Chef of the Kingdom of Morocco.
 : Martin Kristoffersen, Chef of The Queen of Denmark.
 : Franck Panier, Chef of the Grand Duke of Luxembourg.
 : Magnus Åke Rehback, Chef of the King of Sweden.
 : Cristeta Comerford, White House Executive Chef
 : Shalom Kadosh, chef to the President of Israel 
 : Mukesh Kumar, chef to the President of India
 : Ulrich Kerz, chef to the Chancellor of Germany
 :  Hilton Little, chef to the President of South Africa
 : Rupert Schnait, chef to the President of Austria
 : Guillaume Gomez, head chef at the Élysée
 : José Roca, chef to the Prime Minister of Spain

Former members
 : Jérôme Rigaud: Former Chef of the Russian President.
 :( Montu Saini, Chef to the President of India, 2015- 2020), Machindra Kasture, Rashtrapati Bhavan. Chef to the President of India 2007–2015.
 :Bernard Vaussion, chef at the Élysée from 1974 to 2013, Executive Chef from 2005 to 2013
 : Henry Haller, White House Executive Chef from 1966 to 1987

References

External links
Official web site

International diplomatic organizations
Gastronomical societies
Lists of chefs
Culinary diplomacy